Improvised artillery in the Syrian Civil War are improvised firearms created and used by factions of the Syrian Civil War, most notably Syrian opposition forces. The weapons include the Hell-Cannon and its variants, the Thunder Cannon and the Mortar Cannon. The weapons have been criticized for being inaccurate.

Hell-cannon

The hell cannon (Arabic: مدفع جهنم) is a general name used to describe a class of mortar-like improvised firearms in-use by insurgent forces during the Syrian Civil War, mainly in the Aleppo area. It was first noted in 2013 and a number of home-made cannon variants have appeared in Syria since.

History
The Jahannam (Hell) Cannon was first manufactured in 2012 in the Idlib countryside, by the insurgent group Ahrar al-Shamal Brigade. It was specifically designed for shelling the town of al-Foua. It was manufactured at a plant owned by Abu Adnan al-Idlibi in the town of Binnish. Manufacture of the cannon moved to Aleppo after Khaled Hayani – leader of the Badr Martyrs' Brigade – appropriated the design. It was first noted by the press in May 2013, by Brown Moses.

The Hell Cannon and its variants were manufactured by elements of the Free Syrian Army in and around Aleppo in re-purposed manufacturing businesses that had the tools and materials available. As the Islamic State of Iraq and the Levant became more powerful in the region, it negotiated with local arms makers for making the projectiles and a grassroots weapons industry began to emerge. Some of the arms makers moved to al-Bab and Manbij after ISIL was expelled from Aleppo. The most famous was Abdo al-Hiriatany, nicknamed 'Karo the Armenian'.

According to journalist Basel Dayoub in Al Akhbar:

Although invented in the countryside of the Idlib Governorate, the hell cannon was primarily used in the Aleppo area during urban warfare of the Battle of Aleppo. The cannons' medium range (about 1.5 kilometers) requires the target to be nearby, but also for the cannon to remain hidden from counter-battery fire due to it being unarmored. Thus the Hell Cannon is vulnerable in the open countryside. In cities, a combination of close quarter fighting and the ability to hide behind walls and buildings give it an advantage.

Variants

Jahannam (Hell) Cannon

The cannon barrel is about 3 feet long, mounted on wheels and towed. It is muzzle loaded. Explosive powder such as ammonium nitrate is first dropped into the muzzle and tamped with a wooden stick.

The projectile is a re-purposed gas cylinder filled with explosives and shrapnel (the payload). Welded to the payload is about a 2-foot metal tube (the tail) about the same circumference as the cannon's muzzle. The full length of the tail is inserted into the muzzle, forming a tight seal inside the cannon. The payload remains outside the muzzle but still attached to the tail now inside the cannon. When the cannon is fired, the force of the explosion takes the path of least resistance pushing the projectile towards the target at high velocity. Flight stabilizing fins which are part of the tail ensemble ensure the cylinder doesn't tumble.

The projectile weighs up to about 88 pounds with three quarters of the weight as explosives. The projectile reportedly has a range of 1.5 kilometers.

There are believed to be 20 such cannons as of December 2014.

Unnamed variation #1
An (as yet) unnamed variation uses a projectile similar to the hell cannon (a blue gas cylinder) but the tail fins form a flat base. The entire projectile is inserted into a larger diameter cannon, which is the maximum diameter of the projectile.

Jahim (Hellfire) Cannon
The Hell Cannon was followed by the Jahim (Hellfire) Cannon in 2013. This model can fire large ordnance such as water heaters or oxygen cylinders weighing as much as 661 pounds. It was first used in Aleppo's Ashrafieh neighborhood and was also used to attack the Citadel of Aleppo.

Multi-barrel hell cannons

Quad Hell Cannon
A quad hell cannon fired four Hell Cannons at once. However, the model was reportedly no longer manufactured after it was bombed by a military helicopter during the battle of Ard al-Hamra. It was mounted on a front-loading earth mover.

Bureij Hell Cannon
In March 2015, a 7 barrel hell cannon appeared. It is named the Bureij after a Palestinian refugee camp in Gaza.

Thunder cannon
In April 2015, pictorial evidence of the Thunder Cannon became available. The projectile is an empty 100mm shell casing from a T-55 tank that has been re-purposed.

Mortar cannon
In April 2015, the 16th Division in Aleppo showed a video of them using an improvised cannon that fired a mortar round. A metal tube with one end closed is the cannon barrel. The projectile is a factory-made mortar round. The round is placed into the barrel and it is laid horizontally such as out the opening of a window. On launch, the otherwise unattached barrel flies backwards from the recoil of the mortar.

Antique cannon
Rebels deployed a "mystery" antique breech-loaded canon mounted on an hydraulic elevation system on the back of a truck fire with a pull-string. The gun appears to be from the 19th century and likely taken from a museum.

Compressed air cannon
In June 2015, a video was posted online showing a large compressed air cannon in Deraa operated by Ahrar al-Sham.

Improvised rocket
New types of IRAMs including the Volcano IRAM and Elephant Rockets, are used during Syrian Civil War by rebels and government forces alike.

See also
Improvised weapon
Barrack buster
Barrel bomb
Chongtong
Rifle grenade
Stielgranate 41

References

External links
Hell Cannons: From Minor Nuisance to Major Threat, by Type 63 at Bellingcat

Syrian civil war
Homemade firearms
Insurgency weapons
Improvised explosive devices